Paul Alphons Maria van Lange (born 11 October 1961) is a Dutch psychologist known for his research on cooperation and trust in human societies. He is professor of psychology and head of the section of Social Psychology at Vrije Universiteit Amsterdam, where he was first named a professor in 2000. He has previously served as president of the Society of Experimental Social Psychology and director of the Kurt Lewin Institute. In 2014, he received the Kurt Lewin Medal from the European Association of Social Psychology, was the founding editor-in-chief of Current Opinion in Psychology and Current Research in Ecological and Social Psychology, and was named a distinguished research fellow at the University of Oxford.

References

External links

Faculty page
Profile at Social Psychology Network

Living people
1961 births
University of Groningen alumni
Academic staff of Vrije Universiteit Amsterdam
Academic journal editors